Marx's Revenge: The Resurgence of Capitalism and the Death of Statist Socialism is a 2002 book about the contemporary relevance of the philosopher Karl Marx by the economist Meghnad Desai.

Summary

Desai analyses some of Marx's lesser-known writings and argues that his theories enhance our understanding of modern capitalism and globalization.

References

Further reading

Scholarly works

Internet publications 

 
  Parts 1, 2, 3, 4, 5, 6, 7, 8
 
 
 
 
 
 
 
 
 
 
 
 
 
 

2002 non-fiction books
Books about Karl Marx
Books about Marxism
Books by Meghnad Desai
English-language books
English non-fiction books
Verso Books books